Răzvan Cristian Ducan (born 9 February 2001) is a Romanian professional footballer who plays as a goalkeeper for Liga I side FC Botoșani.

Career statistics

Club

References

2001 births
Living people
Romanian footballers
Association football goalkeepers
Liga I players
Liga II players
FC Steaua București players
FC Argeș Pitești players
AFC Turris-Oltul Turnu Măgurele players
CS Mioveni players
FC Botoșani players
People from Teleorman County